Patrick Mayrhofer (born 15 September 1987) is Austria's most successful Paralympic Snowboarder. He won Silver in the Banked Slalom at the 2018 Winter Paralympics in PyeongChang, South Korea, Gold in the Banked Slalom at the 2015 World Para Snowboard World Championships in La Molina, Spain, and Silver in the Banked Slalom at the 2019 World Para Snowboard World Championships in Pyhä, Finland.
In 2015 he was honored as the Paralympic Austrian Sports Personality of the Year.

Biography 
Born in Helfenberg, Upper Austria in 1987, Mayrhofer had been snowboarding since childhood. He worked as an electrician until an accident in February 2008, when he guiltless touched a 6000-volt power line, causing serious injury on his right upper leg, left forearm and right hand. On his right hand  the thumb and parts of the middle finger needs to be amputated. 
After several unsuccessful attempts to reconstruct the function of his left hand Mayrhofer decides to amputate his left hand. His surgeon Dr. Oskar Aszmann from the University of Vienna worked close together with the prosthesis technology company Ottobock. So Mayrhofer became the first patient in the world to undergo elective amputation. After this, he was fitted with a groundbreaking prosthesis, known as a "Michelangelo Hand", The elective amputation allows Mayrhofer to control the prosthesis in the same way as non-amputees do: EMG electrodes in the prosthesis detect muscle signals within the lower arm which can be used for prosthesis control. 
He can open bottles, tie shoelaces and brush his teeth within a short period of time. After the amputation, he worked closely with Ottobock's R&D department giving feedback to the engineers; in 2013 he joined the company as a product specialist in upper limb prosthesis.

Paralympic sport 
Visiting a prosthetics trade show in 2012, Mayrhofer saw a stall run by the Austrian Paralympic Committee, which led to him deciding to pursue para-snowboarding.
At the 2015 World Para Snowboard World Championships at La Molina, Spain, Mayrhofer won the gold medal in the Banked Slalom and came fifth in snowboard cross.

In the 2018 Winter Paralympics, he competed in both snowboarding events, coming fifth in snowboard cross on 12 March but then winning the silver medal in Banked Slalom four days later.

At the 2019 World Para Snowboard World Championships at Pyhä, Finland, Mayrhofer won the silver medal in the Banked Slalom.

Competition history

Personal life 
Mayrhofer is married.

References

External links 
 
 Patrick Mayrhofer at World Para Snowboard
 
 Profile on Ottobock website
 Athlete profile for the 2018 Winter Paralympics
 "My Incredible Story – Patrick Mayrhofer", a video interview on the International Paralympic Committee channel on YouTube

1987 births
Living people
Austrian male snowboarders
Paralympic snowboarders of Austria
Paralympic medalists in snowboarding
Paralympic silver medalists for Austria
Medalists at the 2018 Winter Paralympics
Olympic snowboarders of Austria
People from Rohrbach District
Sportspeople from Upper Austria
Snowboarders at the 2018 Winter Paralympics